Andrea Christine Rodrigues Orem (born January 6, 1990) is an American-born Portuguese football player.

Biography
Rodrigues was born in St. Petersburg, Florida, the daughter of a Portuguese father and a Brazilian mother. Andrea's sister Adriana Rodrigues is also a Portuguese international soccer player. After retiring became the position as Client Services Manager by Orlando Magic.

Career 
The midfielder that used play for UCF Knights in the NCAA and a year in the Women's Premier Soccer League for Tampa Bay Hellenic.

International 
She played the Portuguese national team. She made her international debut at 20 in June 2010 in a 1–0 win over Slovenia.

With one match remaining she was Portugal's top scorer in the 2013 Euro qualifying with four goals.

References

1990 births
Living people
Portuguese women's footballers
Portugal women's international footballers
Brazilian women's footballers
Portuguese people of Brazilian descent
Brazilian people of Portuguese descent
American women's soccer players
American sportspeople of Brazilian descent
American people of Portuguese descent
Women's association football defenders
Women's association football midfielders
UCF Knights women's soccer players
Soccer players from St. Petersburg, Florida
Tampa Bay Hellenic players
Women's Premier Soccer League players